3-Bromopyridine is an organohalide with the formula C5H4BrN. It is a colorless liquid that is mainly used as a building block in organic synthesis.

It participates as a substrate in many reactions associated with aryl halides, e.g., the Heck reaction and Buchwald-Hartwig coupling.

Related compounds
 3-Chloropyridine
 2-Bromopyridine

References 

3-Pyridyl compounds
Bromoarenes